Benjamin Thomas Zobrist (born May 26, 1981), is an American former professional baseball second baseman and outfielder. He played in Major League Baseball (MLB) for the Tampa Bay Devil Rays/Rays, Oakland Athletics, Kansas City Royals, and Chicago Cubs. Zobrist played in three World Series and won the last two, becoming a two-time World Series champion in consecutive seasons of 2015 with the Royals and 2016 with the Cubs, and was the World Series MVP in the latter.

A versatile defender and a switch-hitter with a high walk rate, he played roughly half his innings at second base, and spent significant time at shortstop and various outfield positions. Thus, he has often been referred to as a "super utility player," with subsequent players who also filled this role often being compared to Zobrist.

Early life
Zobrist was born and raised in Eureka, Illinois, by his parents Cynthia "Cindi" (née Cali) and Tom Zobrist, senior pastor of Liberty Bible Church in Eureka. He grew up a St. Louis Cardinals fan.

Zobrist played baseball starting when he was eight years old; he and his friends built their own wiffle ball field behind his house. Zobrist attended Eureka High School, graduating in 1999. After no professional scouts or college recruiters considered him by the time he graduated, Zobrist thought baseball was over for him. "Baseball was not even a thought in my mind", Zobrist said, "When I was done with my last high school game, I was driving around town just thinking I'm done with baseball the rest of my life." Zobrist planned to attend Calvary Bible College in Kansas City, Missouri, but his high school coach encouraged him to spend $50 to participate in an annual summer event that showcased seniors in Peoria, Illinois. He played in the showcase, and was given an offer to play college baseball at Olivet Nazarene University, which he accepted. In his time at Olivet, he pitched and also played at shortstop and second base. In 2002 he was named to both the all-CCAC and all-Region VII First Teams, and received NAIA Honorable Mention All-America status. He was named the Chicagoland Collegiate Athletic Conference Player of the Year, first team All-Region VII, and first team NAIA All-America in 2003. He transferred to Dallas Baptist University for his senior year, where he played shortstop and batted .378 with a .590 slugging percentage.

Baseball career
Zobrist played for the Twin City Stars of the Central Illinois Collegiate League (Now Prospect League) in 2002 and then in Wausau, Wisconsin, for the Wisconsin Woodchucks of the Summer Collegiate Northwoods League in 2003.  He was voted team MVP and led his team to the League Championship.

Tampa Bay Devil Rays/Rays
Zobrist was drafted by the Houston Astros as a shortstop in the sixth round of the 2004 MLB draft. With right-handed pitcher Mitch Talbot, Zobrist was traded to the Tampa Bay Rays for first baseman/designated hitter Aubrey Huff and cash on July 12, 2006.

Zobrist made his MLB debut with Tampa Bay on August 1, 2006. He exclusively played shortstop in his first two seasons with Tampa Bay.

Zobrist struggled through parts of the 2006 and 2007 seasons with the Rays. One day, he met a "swing mechanic" (batting coach) looking for students. The swing coach was able to help Zobrist, and it was evident to the Rays during the 2008 season. "He added the power component", Rays executive vice president Andrew Friedman said, "He became a lot more physical."

2008 season

Zobrist was for the most part used as a right fielder and a back-up shortstop during the 2008 season. In certain situations where a fifth infielder was needed, he or B.J. Upton (a former infielder himself) would be moved in from the outfield during the season. Zobrist went to his first World Series as a player with the Rays in 2008. His versatility was showcased during Game 3 of the 2008 World Series against the National League champion Philadelphia Phillies when he came in as part of a double switch to play right field. However, Zobrist initially played unusually shallow, in essence becoming a fifth infielder.

2009 season

Zobrist was placed in right field for the beginning of the 2009 season, and was made the starting second baseman after teammate Akinori Iwamura was injured. Zobrist enjoyed a breakout season, finishing fourth in the American League in on-base percentage (.405), sixth in walks (91), and seventh in slugging percentage (.543). He earned a trip to his first All-Star Game in St. Louis in 2009. The Tampa Bay Chapter of the Baseball Writers' Association of America named him MVP of the Rays for 2009.

Zobrist led all hitters in the majors in 2009 for wins above replacement with 8.6, ahead of Albert Pujols' 8.4 WAR.

2010 season
On April 23, 2010, Zobrist and the Rays agreed to a three-year contract extension through the 2013 season, with a team option for 2014 and 2015, a deal potentially worth $30 million. In 2010, Zobrist batted .238, with a .353 slugging percentage.

2011 season

On April 28, 2011, Zobrist collected a Tampa Bay Rays record eight RBIs in a 15–3 rout of the Minnesota Twins. Another game was held during the day to make up for a previously rained out game and Zobrist drove in another two runs, making a total 10 RBIs for the day.

Zobrist led the American League in WAR with 8.8, ahead of MVP Justin Verlander and MVP runner up Jacoby Ellsbury.

2012 season 
During the 2012 season, Zobrist's skills were used at multiple positions. He played 47 games at shortstop, the most since his rookie season. He was also used as an outfielder and second baseman.

Zobrist finished the year with 20 home runs, accomplishing the feat for the second time in a row.

2013 season
On April 8, 2013, Zobrist became the strikeout victim on a disputed call that led to Joe Nathan's 300th career save. Zobrist was named an All Star for the second time of his career. He finished the 2013 season with a .275 batting average, his highest since 2009.

2014 season
On September 10, Zobrist recorded his 1,000th career hit, which came against the New York Yankees in Yankee Stadium.

Oakland Athletics
On January 10, 2015, Zobrist was traded to the Oakland Athletics with teammate Yunel Escobar in exchange for John Jaso, Daniel Robertson, and Boog Powell.
On Opening Day with the Athletics, Zobrist hit a two-run home run in his first at-bat. On April 25, 2015, it was revealed that Zobrist had a torn medial meniscus in his left knee, putting him on the 15-day disabled list. The knee required surgery, keeping Zobrist out of action for 4–6 weeks.

Kansas City Royals

On July 28, 2015, Zobrist was traded to the Kansas City Royals for Sean Manaea and Aaron Brooks. He played 59 games in the regular season for Kansas City and finished with a batting average of .284, with 7 home runs, 37 runs scored, and 23 RBIs.

The Royals won the AL Central Division and played the Houston Astros for the ALDS with Zobrist starting in all five games. The Royals advanced to the World Series after defeating the Toronto Blue Jays in six games to become the American League Champions. The Royals won the 2015 World Series after defeating the New York Mets in four of the five games played. Zobrist played second base and batted second in every game of the 2015 Royals postseason. He hit .303 in the 2015 postseason with 66 at bats, 15 runs scored, 20 hits, 2 home runs, and 6 RBIs.

Chicago Cubs

On December 8, 2015, Zobrist agreed to a four-year, $56 million contract with the Chicago Cubs. The signing reunited him with Joe Maddon, his manager when he was a member of the Tampa Bay Rays. In 2016, he batted .272/.386/.446 and led the major leagues in walks-per-strikeout at 1.17.

In Game 4 of the 2016 National League Division Series against the San Francisco Giants with the Cubs having a 2–1 series lead, Zobrist drove in Kris Bryant to score the first run in the top of the ninth and later scored the tying run on a two-run single by Willson Contreras. The Cubs scored another run later that inning, sending them to the National League Championship Series. Following the Cubs' Game 7 victory in the 2016 World Series, after driving in the first of two go-ahead runs in the top of the 10th inning, he was named the World Series Most Valuable Player and received his second World Series ring. He became the eighth player in Major League history to win consecutive World Series championships on different teams.

In 2017, Zobrist played in 159 games, batting .232/.318/.375. Playing five different positions, he committed only three errors and had a fielding percentage of .991. He was a finalist for the Gold Glove Award at second base, along with Dee Gordon and winner DJ LeMahieu.

In 2018, he had a career-high batting average of .305. He was ejected for the first time in his career on August 14, 2018, by home plate umpire Phil Cuzzi.

In 2019, Zobrist started the season playing in 26 games before being placed on the restricted list on May 6 to deal with a family matter. Following rumors throughout the next months, Zobrist announced his return in late July 2019, and began rehab assignments with the South Bend Cubs and Myrtle Beach Pelicans. Zobrist also had his first Major League pitching appearance in September 2019, striking out Yadier Molina. In 2019 he batted .260/.358/.313 with one home run in 150 at bats.

Retirement
In February 2020, Jon Heyman reported that Zobrist was not planning to play in the 2020 season. Zobrist confirmed his retirement on March 6, and said he was open to joining the Cubs in a non-player capacity "down the line".

Player profile
Zobrist was an above-average hitter with a career slash line of .264/.354/.429 and a wRC+ of 118. He accomplished this with a patient, contact-based approach; his swing rate was one of the lowest in the league, leading to a walk rate of 12.5% and a contact rate of 85.3%. He was also an above-average baserunner, who had 102 stolen bases at a success rate of 74%.

Zobrist was noted for his defensive versatility. He played over 4,200 defensive innings at second base, over 2,200 in right field, over 1,700 at shortstop, and over 500 innings at other outfield positions. Zobrist was rated by UZR as a significantly above-average defender at second and in right, and a marginally below-average defender at shortstop.

His nickname, "Zorilla," was given to him by his manager Joe Maddon while playing for the Rays in 2009. Zobrist chose "Zorilla" as his nickname for the Players Weekend during the 2017 season.

Personal life
Zobrist lives in Franklin, Tennessee. He and his estranged wife, singer Julianna Zobrist, have three children, one of whom was born five days after Zobrist's Royals won the 2015 World Series. Julianna gave birth to Blaise Royal the day after the Royals World Series parade. In May 2019, Zobrist filed for legal separation in Tennessee on the same day that Julianna Zobrist filed for divorce in Illinois. Their marital problems had led Zobrist to pause his participation in the 2019 MLB season.

In June 2021, Zobrist filed a lawsuit in Tennessee against his former pastor, Byron Yawn, in which he accused Yawn of defrauding Zobrist's charity, Patriot Forward, of millions of dollars. The lawsuit also alleged that Yawn had had a year-long sexual affair with Julianna Zobrist beginning in the spring of 2019.

Zobrist is a former counselor for Camp of Champions USA, a Christian summer day camp in central Illinois. He speaks at church events about his early life and success, which he credits all to God. Zobrist often talks about his Christian faith, saying God helped him realize that he was supposed to play baseball. "I just felt like everything fell into place so much, that this is what I was supposed to do. This is what I was made to do." He and former teammate Gabe Gross have talked about how they organize Bible studies with their teammates. St. Pete Times writer Marc Topkin wrote Zobrist "doesn't judge or proselytize, refraining from forcing his beliefs on anyone, though willing to get involved if asked."

In the 2013 film Ring The Bell, released by Provident Films, Zobrist plays himself in a cameo role alongside Rick Sutcliffe, John Kruk, Mark Hall (also playing themselves), Ryan Scharoun, Ashley Anderson McCarthy, and Casey Bond.

References

External links

1981 births
Living people
American Christians
American League All-Stars
American people of Swiss-German descent
Baseball players from Illinois
Charlotte Stone Crabs players
Chicago Cubs players
Corpus Christi Hooks players
Dallas Baptist Patriots baseball players
Durham Bulls players
Kansas City Royals players
Lexington Legends players
Major League Baseball second basemen
Major League Baseball shortstops
Major League Baseball outfielders
Nashville Sounds players
National League All-Stars
Oakland Athletics players
Olivet Nazarene Tigers baseball players
People from Eureka, Illinois
Phoenix Desert Dogs players
Salem Avalanche players
Stockton Ports players
Tampa Bay Devil Rays players
Tampa Bay Rays players
Tri-City ValleyCats players
Vero Beach Devil Rays players
Wisconsin Woodchucks players
World Baseball Classic players of the United States
World Series Most Valuable Player Award winners
2013 World Baseball Classic players